Coulter Glacier is a steeply inclined glacier,  long, flowing south from the Havre Mountains, northern Alexander Island, into Kolokita Cove in Lazarev Bay, Antarctica. The glacier was photographed from the air by the Ronne Antarctic Research Expedition in 1947 and mapped from the photographs by the Falkland Islands Dependencies Survey in 1960. It was named by the Advisory Committee on Antarctic Names for R.W. Coulter, Master of USNS Alatna during U.S. Navy Operation Deepfreeze, 1969.

See also

 List of glaciers in the Antarctic
 Yozola Glacier
 Sullivan Glacier

References 

Glaciers of Alexander Island